"Air Mail Special" is a 1941 jazz standard written by Benny Goodman, James Mundy and Charlie Christian. Jazz fans know it best as a vehicle for the virtuoso scat singing of Ella Fitzgerald; her memorable take at the 1957 Newport Jazz Festival is representative.

See also
List of jazz standards

References

1940s jazz standards
1941 songs
Benny Goodman songs